Clara Augusta Amalie Emma Lobedan (1840–1918) was a German painter, watercolorist, pastelist, ceramicist, and craftsman.

Biography
Lobedan was born on 8 August 1840 in Naumburg, Germany.

She studied painting under  and Karl Gussow in Berlin. Lobedan exhibited her work at the Woman's Building at the 1893 World's Columbian Exposition in Chicago, Illinois. She is thought to have established an art school for women in Berlin. She is known to have taught Hildegard Lehnert.

Lobedan died in 1918 in Berlin.

References

External links
  
 images of Lobedan's work on ArtNet

1840 births
1918 deaths
German women painters
19th-century German women artists
20th-century German women artists
19th-century German painters
20th-century German painters
German watercolourists